Sydney Graham Gedye (2 May 1929 – 10 August 2014) was a New Zealand Test cricketer who played for Auckland. He was the 98th Test cap for New Zealand.

Cricket career
A right-handed opening batsman, Gedye made his debut for Auckland in 1956-57 and played unobtrusively for several seasons with a top score of 88 before coming into prominence with two centuries in the match against Central Districts in 1963–64.

That performance propelled him into the New Zealand Test team for the three-match series against South Africa. He made 10 and a match-saving 52 in around 70 overs in the First Test, and 18 and 55 in the Third Test. His 166 runs at an average of 27.66 placed him third in the New Zealanders' averages and aggregates for the series.

He retained his spot in the Test team the following season after another century in a victory over Central Districts, but after the First Test against Pakistan, in which he scored 26 in 160 minutes, he was dropped. When he then failed to be selected for the tours to India, Pakistan and England in 1965, he retired from first-class cricket.

He and Roger Harris opened the batting together in several hundred games for their club in Auckland and for Auckland in the Plunket Shield. Gedye also played rugby for Auckland.

See also
 List of Auckland representative cricketers

References

External links
 Graham Gedye at Cricket Archive
 Graham Gedye at Cricinfo

1929 births
2014 deaths
New Zealand cricketers
New Zealand Test cricketers
Auckland cricketers